Droylsden is a town in Tameside, Greater Manchester, England.  The town, together with its suburb of Littlemoss, contains 37 listed buildings that are recorded in the National Heritage List for England.  Of these, three are listed at Grade II*, the middle grade, and the others are at Grade II, the lowest grade.

Originally a rural and farming community, linen bleaching and weaving came to the area in the mid 18th century.  Then in 1785, members of the Moravian Church came to the area, and established the community of the Fairfield Moravian Church.  Many of the buildings associated with this community are listed, together with farmhouses and farm buildings from the earlier era.  The Ashton Canal passes through the area, and a lock, a bridge, and other buildings associated with it are listed.  The other listed buildings include  a church, a former toll house, and a school.


Key

Buildings

References

Citations

Sources

Lists of listed buildings in Greater Manchester
Listed